Magandang Dilag is an upcoming Philippine television drama series to be broadcast by GMA Network. Directed by Jorron Lee Monroy, it stars Herlene Budol in the title role. It is set to premiere in 2023 on the network's Afternoon Prime line up.

Cast and characters 
Lead cast
 Herlene Budol as Gigi

Supporting cast
 Benjamin Alves as Eric
 Rob Gomez as Jared
 Maxine Medina as Blaire
 Al Tantay
 Sandy Andolong
 Chanda Romero
 Adrian Alandy as Magnus
 Bianca Manalo as Riley
 Pamela Prinster
 Angela Alarcon as Alisson
 Jade Tecson

Guest cast
 Christopher de Leon

Production 
Principal photography commenced on November 30, 2022.

References 

Filipino-language television shows
GMA Network drama series
Television shows set in the Philippines
Upcoming drama television series